Don Coleman is a Canadian vocalist, songwriter, lyricist, performer and AC/DC tribute frontman.

In the autumn of 2021 Don Coleman released a song and video titled "Albert County Home Sweet Home" that celebrates Albert County, New Brunswick, Canada.

References

External links 
 Carolina's (NHL) Canadian Anthem – Toronto Star Newspaper
 Albert County Home Sweet Home Audio/Visual Experience - Times & Transcript/Telegraph Journal Newspapers
 CTV Television Canada Interview - This Is My Canada / Mon cher Canada
 CBC Radio Interview / Mainstreet Show PEI- This Is My Canada / Mon cher Canada
 Loud Hard Fast & Wild – Here Magazine
 Small Band-Aid Charity Concert – Times & Transcript Newspaper
 Small Band-Aid Charity Concert – Times & Transcript Newspaper Follow-Up
 Rockstar Weekly Magazine Show Review July 2010
 CBC Television Canada Interview
 This Is My Canada / Mon cher Canada - Music New Brunswick Article 
 This Is My Canada / Mon cher Canada - 105.9 FM The Max Article
 CTV News / Don Coleman Performs at Gordon Lightfoot's 75th Birthday Celebration
 CBC TV News / Don Coleman Recognized on AC/DC's Website - Bon Scott Tribute Song Radio Airplay in 26+ Countries
 CTV News / Don Coleman Spearheads Jeff Healey Canada's Walk of Fame Campaign
 Toronto News 24 / Don Coleman Spearheads Jeff Healey Canada's Walk of Fame Campaign
 Rogers TV News / Don Coleman Raises Funds for Moncton Headstart Inc Registered Non-Profit Organization
 House of Blues Radio Hour / Don Coleman's Tribute Song To Jeff Healey
 CBC Ontario Morning - Radio Interview / Don Coleman's Tribute Song To Gordon Lightfoot
 Moose FM Timmins & North Bay, Ontario, Canada - Radio Interview / Don Coleman's Tribute Song To Gordon Lightfoot Raises Money for MusiCounts

Canadian rock singers
Canadian male singers
Canadian singer-songwriters
Living people
Writers from Ontario
Tribute bands
Musicians from New Brunswick
Musicians from Ontario
Year of birth missing (living people)
Canadian male singer-songwriters